Sega Ski Super G is a skiing arcade video game released by Sega in 1996. The game was built on the Sega Model 2 arcade hardware.

Gameplay
In Sega Ski Super G, the objective is to race against other opponents under a time limit. The game has two modes: World Series and Time Attack.

Reception
In Japan, Game Machine listed Sega Ski Super G on their February 15, 1997 issue as being the fourth most-successful dedicated arcade game of the month. Next Generation noted that the game's cabinet is physically demanding, particularly because the foot pedals are slanted, requiring players to lean forward, but highly praised the game's sense of speed, pacing, aggressive opponents, rigorous challenge, and varying types of snow. The reviewer compared it favorably to its contemporary competitor, Alpine Racer 2, and gave it four out of five stars.

Rarity
On KLOV.com, Sega Ski Super G is classified as very rare.

References

1. https://web.archive.org/web/20101128044739/http://segaarcade.com/archive/segaski.aspx

2. http://www.arcade-museum.com/game_detail.php?game_id=10634

1996 video games
Sega arcade games
Arcade video games
Arcade-only video games
Skiing video games
Video games developed in Japan